is a coastal town and a municipality in Viken county, Norway. The administrative centre of the municipality is the town of Moss. The city of Moss was established as a municipality on 1 January 1838 (see formannskapsdistrikt) and City in 1720. The rural municipality of Jeløy was merged with the city on 1 July 1943.  The former municipality of Rygge was merged into it on January 1, 2020.

Its administrative district covers areas east of the town, such as the island of Dillingøy in the lake Vansjø. Parts of the town are located on the peninsula of Jeløy. The city of Moss has 30,723 inhabitants (2012).

Name
It may be derived from an old root mer- which means to "divide" or "split".

The adjacent topography shares similar etymology:
The name is thought to be very old and the meaning of it is not clear.
 , Mosse-"marsh-river-border"+  (Moss channel).
 , Mosse-"marsh-river-border"+  -"court" akin to hort(us,en), "garden," from PIE *ghr-ti-, from base *gher- "to grasp, enclose" (see yard) Actually "Moss county".

History
Archeological finds suggest that there were settlements in the area more than 7,000 years ago and continuously through the Iron Age, Viking Age, through to modern times. During the Viking era, the place was known as Varna (from the Old Norse , or protection) and was the site of a cooperative for battleships held by local warlords on behalf of the king.

The first literary reference to the name Mo(u)ſs(ß) is from Bishop Eystein Aslaksson's Red book (NRA AM fol. 328) from 1396, and by then the town had become a commercial center with craftsmen and mills. By the 16th century, the town's port was significant enough to warrant its own customs official. Liquor distilleries became one of the dominant industries, and it was not until 1607, after the Reformation, that the town got its own church.

By 1700, Moss had become a hub for both ship and land traffic between Copenhagen and Christiania, and in 1704 Moss Jernverk (Moss Ironworks) was established just north of the city center. By 1720 it received its charter as a merchant town, with its own official. This may have had background in an important battle in 1716 that was fought in the town square in Moss in which Norwegian troops commanded by Vincent Budde prevailed over invading Swedish forces, sent by Charles XII to capture Akershus Fortress. In 1767 a local resident built a "pleasure pavilion" near the town, which survives as the Hotel Refsnes Gods.

In 1814, Moss became the site for the signing of the Convention of Moss, which effectively put an end to the Dano-Norwegian kingdom. This set the stage for economic development that has persisted to this day.

On the morning of 14 July 2006, a bolide exploded above the nearby town of Rygge - moments later, several stony meteorites fell over Moss. A number of meteorites were recovered by local residents and visiting meteorite hunters, which after analysis and classification, were found to be a rare type of carbonaceous chondrite.

Seal and coat-of-arms
Moss became a separate city in 1786 and received its first seal the same year. The seal showed a church under some clouds, placed within a circle. Above the circle were fasces, the late 19th century symbol of freedom. A later seal, dating from around 1829, shows the same composition, but with six birds flying around the church. 

In the 1930s the city wanted to adopt a coat-of-arms and the birds were chosen as a possible symbol. The original birds were likely doves, a symbol of peace. In 1934, the idea of the crow was launched. The residents of Moss have long been referred to as crows. An old tale tells of a number of birds, thought to have been crows, swarming around the church spire due to a fire that started when lightning struck a birds' nest in the spire. The fire was quickly put out; birds became a motif in the city seal (and later coat-of-arms) for that reason.

The coat-of-arms was granted on 2 April 1954 and shows a yellow crow on a red background. It was designed by Christian Stenersen.

Norwegian lady statues
Moss and Virginia Beach, Virginia in the United States are sister cities. On Good Friday, 27 March 1891, the Norwegian bark Dictator, whose home port was Moss, was lost in the treacherous waters of the Graveyard of the Atlantic. The ship had been en route to England from Pensacola, Florida with a cargo of Georgia Pine lumber. After being caught and disabled in a storm, she was headed for port at Hampton Roads, Virginia to make repairs when she encountered another storm just off Virginia Beach.

Working in the high winds and seas, lifesaving crews from shore were able to save some of the 17 persons aboard. However, the pregnant wife of Captain J.M. Jorgensen, Johanne, and their 4-year-old son Carl were among the 7 persons who drowned.

The ship's wooden female figurehead had washed ashore. It was placed in a vertical position facing the ocean near the boardwalk as a memorial to those who lost their lives in the shipwreck. It was a landmark there for more than 60 years, but gradually became weathered and eroded.

In 1962, Norwegian sculptor Ørnulf Bast was commissioned to create two nine-foot bronze replicas of the original figurehead by the City of Moss. The Norwegian Lady Statues were unveiled on 22 September 1962. One was presented as a gift to Virginia Beach, and an exact duplicate was erected in Moss to unite the two sister cities. Each statue gives the appearance of facing the other across the Atlantic Ocean.

On 13 October 1995, Queen Sonja of Norway visited the Norwegian Lady statue in Virginia Beach, and placed memorial flowers.

Geography
Moss is located on the eastern shore of Oslofjord, 60 km south of Oslo. The municipality also includes some islands, like Jeløya. The Raet goes through the municipality. The area is forested lowland, the highest point is 140 m asl. 84 % of the population is located in the town Moss.

Climate
Moss has a humid continental climate (Dfb), or a temperate oceanic climate (Cfb) if the original   threshold in the Köppen climate classification is used.
The weather station at Moss Airport Rygge (40 m) started recording temperature in 1955. The all-time high  was recorded August 1982, and the all-time low  in February 1985. 10 of the record lows are from before 1990, and only the December record low is from after 2000. Rygge airport is located more inland and will have colder lows in winter and autumn than the town. The average date for first overnight freeze (below ) in autumn is October 7 (1981-2010 average) at Rygge.

Industry
The town is known for paper mills, as well as metalworks and other factories. Dillingøy is known as a place for alternative non-military civil service. Moss is mentioned since the Renaissance and was the site of the signing of the Convention of Moss in 1814, which solidified the union with Sweden. The headquarters of textile producer Helly Hansen were located in Moss until 2009. The maker of international hotel keycards, Trio Ving, also has their headquarters here.

Transport
The railway Østfold Line runs through Moss, stopping at Moss Station, which is the southern terminus of one service of the Oslo Commuter Rail and an intermediate stop for regional trains. Moss connects across the Oslofjord to Horten via the Moss–Horten Ferry. There are also bus-lines to Oslo Airport, Gardermoen, Gothenburg, Copenhagen, Oslo in addition to local bus lines. Moss port is one of the top 3 busiest container ports in Norway (measured in TEUs).

Health care
Together with Østfold Kalnes Hospital, Østfold Moss Hospital covers general health care services for the municipality. The hospital is a modern unit for planned operations. There is a large outpatient and inpatient activity in a number of disciplines, in the field of somatics and mental health care as well as an operation department for both inpatient and day surgery. There is an eye department, imaging services, blood sampling and blood bank and more. The municipality also has three health stations - City center, Bredsand and Kambo health stations.

Sport
Moss FK are the town's football club. They play in the Second Division, and have played in the Norwegian Premier League as recently as 2002.

Notable people 

 people from Moss are known locally as "Mossinger"
 Ari Behn (1972–2019), author and playwright; former husband of Princess Märtha Louise of Norway; brought up in Moss
 Tina Bru (born 1986 in Moss), politician and government minister
 Palle Rømer Fleischer (1781 in Moss – 1851), representative at the Norwegian Constitutional Assembly
 Gregers Gram (1846 in Moss – 1929), Norwegian prime minister in Stockholm, 1889 to 1891
 Christopher Hansteen (1822 in Moss – 1912), judge, associate justice on the Supreme Court of Norway, 1867 to 1905
 Eyvind Hellstrøm ((born 1948 in Moss), gourmet chef and TV personality
 Knut Jacobsen (1910–1971), actor and costume designer
 Gretha Kant (born 1945), politician, mayor of Moss, 1995 to 2003
 Jorunn Kristiansen, Miss Norway 1959
 David Menkin (born 1977 in Moss), film, TV and voice actor
 Jon Michelet (1944 in Moss – 2018), novelist, author of crime novels, newspaper columns, and children's books
 Grynet Molvig (born 1942 in Rygge), Norwegian actress and singer
 Hanna Paulsberg (born 1987 in Rygge), jazz musician (tenor saxophone) and composer
 Johan Scharffenberg (1869 in Moss – 1965), psychiatrist, politician, speaker, and writer
 Per Schwenzen (1899 in Moss – 1984), writer of screenplays and librettos for operettas
 Arild Sibbern (1785 in Rygge – 1863), representative at the Norwegian Constituent Assembly
 Georg Sibbern (1816 in Rygge – 1901), prime minister of Norway 1858/61 and 1861/1871
 Torgrim Sørnes (born 1956 in Moss), physician, historian, and author

Sports 
 Einar Jan Aas (born 1955 in Moss), former footballer with 35 caps for Norway
 Agnete Carlsen (born 1971 in Moss), former footballer with 97 caps with Norway women
 Erik Holtan (born 1969 in Moss), retired football goalkeeper with 330 club caps
 Rune Pedersen (born 1963 in Moss), former football referee
 Thomas Myhre (born 1973, grew up in Moss), retired football goalkeeper with 56 caps for Norway
 Erland Johnsen (born 1967, grew up in Moss), retired footballer with 24 caps for Norway

International relations

Twin towns — Sister cities
The following cities are twinned with Moss:
  Aguacatán, Guatemala
  Blönduós, Iceland
  Horsens, Denmark
  Karlstad, Sweden
  Nokia, Finland
  Novgorod, Russia
  Virginia Beach, Virginia, United States

Use of preposition with Moss 
"In Moss" is translated i Moss. In the 1800s one said [on Moss] på Moss.

In popular culture
A traditional expression, [the hay scale at Moss] høyvekta på Moss, means "something that you can not trust".
Moss is known throughout Norway for the local "dish" "Pølse i Vaffel" - sausage in waffle. The dish consists of a Vienna Sausage served in a Scandinavian style waffle with ketchup and mustard. The dish was most likely created in the 1960s, but this is widely discussed. Eyvind Hellstrøm - who later became a Michelin-star chef - and his brother Jan are often referred to as the creators. Eyvind Hellstrøm has not denied this in interviews.

Gallery

References

External links

 Municipal fact sheet from Statistics Norway
 
 Municipal website 
 Municipal website 
 Moss meteorites
 Foto-Moss.com 
 Mossby.no 
 "Moss Avis" local newspaper 
 Short historical summary of Moss 
 Norwegian Lady statue
 "Mofs Avis", parodic local newspaper 

 
Municipalities of Østfold
Municipalities of Viken (county)
Cities and towns in Norway